Boyz on Block are an English and Irish supergroup formed in 2019 consisting of Phats & Small singer Ben Ofoedu and former boy band members Abz Love, Dane Bowers and Shane Lynch from the groups Five, Another Level and Boyzone, respectively.

Career
Having all met during their heydays, in 2019 while booked for the same show, Abz Love, Dane Bowers, Shane Lynch and Ben Ofoedu all found themselves on stage together and decided to form their own band.

On 20 November 2020, the group released a cover of East 17's "Stay Another Day" featuring songwriter and former East 17 member Tony Mortimer with an accompanying music video.

On 15 February 2021, their first official single, a cover of K-Ci & JoJo's "All My Life" was released along with an accompanying music video and some remixes. An album had been scheduled for a 2021 release.

On 31 January 2022, they released their cover of "Unbelievable" as a single.

On 21 September 2021, Boyz on Block appeared in the relaunch episode of British comedy music quiz panel show Never Mind the Buzzcocks during the "Live Identity Parade" segment.

Discography

Singles

References

English pop music groups
Pop music supergroups
British supergroups